Eva-Lotta Kiibus (born 17 January 2003) is an Estonian figure skater. She is the 2020 Nebelhorn Trophy champion, a two-time Estonian national champion (2020–21), and a three-time Tallink Hotels Cup champion (2018–2019, 2021). Kiibus has represented Estonia at the European and World championships and finished twenty-first at the 2022 Winter Olympics.

Personal life 
Kiibus was born on 17 January 2003 in Tallinn. Her older brother is Estonian rapper Nublu. As of 2023, she is a student at the University of Tartu.

Career

Early years 
Kiibus began learning to skate in 2007. She competed in the advanced novice ranks in the 2015–2016 season and made her junior international debut the following season.

2018–2019 season 
In September 2018, Kiibus debuted on both the ISU Junior Grand Prix series and the senior-level ISU Challenger Series. In December, she won silver at Estonia's senior championships, finishing second to Gerli Liinamäe. She became the national junior champion the following month. In February 2019, she won gold in the senior ladies' category at the Tallink Hotels Cup.

In March, Kiibus appeared at her first ISU Championship – the 2019 World Junior Championships in Zagreb, Croatia. She was ranked 26th in the short program but did not advance to the final segment. Later that month, she competed at the 2019 World Championships in Saitama, Japan. She qualified for the final segment by placing 23rd in the short program.

2019–2020 season 

Kiibus continued competing on senior and junior levels for the new season. On the Junior Grand Prix circuit, she placed seventh at the 2019 JGP Chelyabinsk in Russia and eighth at 2019 JGP Egna in Italy. On the senior level, in the first half of the season, she took part in three Challenger events, initially placing sixth at both the 2019 CS Nebelhorn Trophy and 2019 CS Finlandia Trophy. She was eleventh at the 2019 CS Golden Spin of Zagreb.
In December, Kiibus became the Estonian senior national champion.

In January 2020, Kiibus first competed at the 2020 Winter Youth Olympics, placing fourteenth. She then made her debut at the European Championships, placing eleventh in the short program.  Fifth in the free skate with a new personal best, she rose to seventh place overall. Kiibus said afterward that it was "such an experience. I felt so good, and I skated with my heart."  She was assigned to compete at the World Championships in Montreal, but those were cancelled as a result of the coronavirus pandemic.

2020–2021 season 
With pandemic-related travel restrictions in place, Kiibus started off her season at a 2020 CS Nebelhorn Trophy attended only by skaters training in Europe. Third after the short program, she won the free skate and took the gold medal, her first Challenger title. Shortly afterward, she won the silver medal at the 2020 CS Budapest Trophy, regarding her performance there as an improvement over Nebelhorn despite the lower ordinal. 

Kiibus was assigned to make her Grand Prix debut at the 2020 Internationaux de France, the ISU having opted to allot the Grand Prix for that season based primarily on geographic location. The event was later cancelled due to the pandemic, but Kiibus was subsequently reassigned to the 2020 Rostelecom Cup.  She placed sixth at the Moscow event.  Kiibus was one of several skaters to contract COVID-19 at the Rostelecom Cup, as a result of which she took weeks to recover, and indicated at the Estonian Championships that mental recovery would take longer. She placed third in the short program at the national championships.  She rallied in the free skate to edge out Gerli Liinamäe for the gold medal by 0.31 points.  Following her victory at the national championships, Kiibus competed internationally again at the Tallink Hotels Cup, winning her third gold medal.

Competing at the 2021 World Championships in Stockholm, Kiibus placed nineteenth in the short program but moved up to fourteenth place after the free skate. Kiibus qualified for a place for Estonia at the 2022 Winter Olympics. She said she was "happy and proud that I was able to control my nerves."

2021–2022 season 
Kiibus began the Olympic season at the 2021 CS Lombardia Trophy, where she placed eleventh. She next competed at the 2021 CS Finlandia Trophy, skating two clean programs to place seventh overall. She earned new personal bests in the free program and overall score, breaking 200 points for the first time in her career. She enjoyed less success at her two subsequent events, first finishing seventeenth at the 2021 CS Cup of Austria, notably with a score nearly forty points behind domestic rival Niina Petrõkina, who won the bronze medal. She then finished in eleventh place at the 2021 Rostelecom Cup. 

Petrõkina again bested Kiibus at the 2021 Estonian Championships, where she finished second overall with a score of 183.77, almost 29 points out of the gold medal position. She finished behind Petrõkina again at the 2022 European Championships, but despite this, due to the Estonian federation's criteria, she was still named to the Estonian Olympic team. Kiibus' coach Anna Levandi said that while the season had been difficult for her, she was preparing to show her best in Beijing.

Competing at the 2022 Winter Olympics in the women's event, Kiibus placed twenty-first in the short program after falling on her solo jump attempt. She was twentieth in the free skate but remained twenty-first overall. Kiibus had surgery on one of her legs following the Olympics and was off the ice for three months recovering.

2022–2023 season 
On 31 August 2022, Kiibus announced that she had decided to change coaches, parting ways with longtime coach Anna Levandi to train in the Netherlands under Thomas Kennes. In her season debut at the 2022 CS Nebelhorn Trophy, she won the bronze medal. On the Grand Prix, she was twelfth of twelve skaters at both the 2022 NHK Trophy and 2022 Grand Prix of Espoo.

Programs

Competitive highlights 
GP: Grand Prix; CS: Challenger Series; JGP: Junior Grand Prix

Detailed results 
Small medals for short and free programs awarded only at ISU Championships.

Senior results

Junior results

References

External links 
 

2003 births
Estonian female single skaters
Living people
Figure skaters from Tallinn
Figure skaters at the 2020 Winter Youth Olympics
Figure skaters at the 2022 Winter Olympics
Olympic figure skaters of Estonia
Competitors at the 2023 Winter World University Games